Tomanak-e Olya (also Romanized as Tomanak-e ‘Olyā) is a village in Pataveh Rural District, Pataveh District, Dana County, Kohgiluyeh and Boyer-Ahmad Province, Iran. At the 2006 census, its population was 1,248, in 242 families.

References 

Populated places in Dana County